Willis Island is the only permanently inhabited island in the Coral Sea Islands Territory, an external territory of Australia, located beyond the Great Barrier Reef in the Coral Sea.

Weather monitoring station

The Australian Bureau of Meteorology has a weather station on the island.  There are usually four weather observers, one of whom is Officer-in-Charge, and one Technical Officer (electronic engineering) living on the island.

History
The Willis Island weather monitoring station was established in 1921 and equipped with a radio transmitter in order to provide a cyclone early warning service for Queensland.  The first officer in charge was John King Davis.

Cyclone Yasi
On 2 February 2011, sometime shortly after 08:30 AEST, the eye of Cyclone Yasi moved directly over Willis Island as a Category 5 tropical cyclone. Four station staff had been evacuated the previous day. The barometric pressure fell to an exceptionally low . Around 9:00 am, radar data was disrupted. Roughly an hour later, communication with the island was completely cut off. The cyclone was so strong it altered the shape of the island and cleared much of its vegetation.

Limited services were restored on 17 February 2011. A Bureau of Meteorology spokeswoman later said the core building sustained minor damage to the roof, deck covering and one of the solar panels.  "The radome which protects the radar was completely destroyed and the radar itself sustained damage and needed to be replaced," she said.  The associated storm surge also damaged the power generator, sewage system and desalination equipment.  Operation of the weather monitoring station was restored on 12 December 2011.

Infrastructure

Past infrastructure
Up to 2004 most of the infrastructure constructed in either 1950 or 1968 still existed. Maintenance and refurbishment had been an ongoing costly process. The small parcel of land (total island is 7.7 hectares) accommodated eight buildings of varying structure as follows:

 Main building housing recreation, kitchen/dining, sleeping, office and equipment room constructed in 1950
 Main store constructed in 1950
 Laundry building constructed in 1950
 Bunker/Cyclone Shelter constructed in 1950
 Generator building constructed in 1968
 Fire pump building constructed in 1968
 Flammable liquids bunker constructed in 1968
 Balloon filling and hydrogen storage building constructed 1950 (condemned)
Personal living accommodation was provided in a barracks-like wing between the meteorological office and the kitchen-living room area.
Meteorological equipment included a defined equipment enclosure and a  radar tower plus dome.
Other equipment included a desalination plant and enviro-cycle sewage treatment plant.

Current infrastructure
From 2005, the following new facilities and services have been constructed:

 Meteorological office, mess area, accommodation, recreational area, powerhouse
 Hydrogen generator building and gas storage, including associated site works
 Relocated fuel storage tanks to a new concrete bunded diesel fuel area
 Underground services related to communications, power distribution, water, sewage and fire hose reel services
 Relocated satellite dishes and radar tower
 Refurbished salt water pump building

Accommodation facilities caters for four permanent staff and up to 10 visiting personnel.

Meteorological equipment includes a defined equipment enclosure and a  radar tower plus dome. Other equipment includes a desalination plant and enviro-cycle sewage treatment plant. Power generation comprises a hybrid system of a diesel generator combined with a wind generator and solar power. Rainwater harvesting has not been implemented due to the high level of marine bird life and guano deposits.

Recreation
The station has a recreation room which includes amenities such as a pool table, darts and table tennis, along with an outside sporting area and a home gym.  There are also opportunities for recreational fishing.

A substantial library caters for all tastes. Two satellite television systems enable reception of Australian Channel 10 and the ABC, and of free-to-air transmissions from countries such as Malaysia and Indonesia. Programming includes the American television channels CNN and MTV and an extensive video library completes the passive entertainment options.

Occasional amateur radio operations occur in the Willis islets. Under DXCC rules Willis is considered to be a separate "entity" (equivalent to country) for award credit.  A major DX-pedition visited for several weeks in October 2008 (VK9DWX). Another operated here in November 2015 (VK9WA).

Hazard reduction
In the past, landfill was buried on the island, and occasionally high winds and heavy seas from a cyclone would uncover parts of the waste. A major clean-up campaign was conducted in 2004 and 2005 to protect the sensitive areas such as the coral cays and sand dunes.

Today, all waste generated on the island, as well as any debris that washes ashore, is placed in bins and shipped back on the staff exchange vessel for appropriate disposal on the mainland.

Tropical Cyclone Yasi uncovered a landfill site on the island, which was found to include some asbestos containing material (ACM). The area was remediated and all waste was removed from the island.

Three formal Occupational Health and Safety investigations on Willis Island have been undertaken by independent assessors – GHD (2007 and 2011) and Parsons Brinkerhoff (April 2011 – after TC Yasi). These investigations found no significant potential for exposure to asbestos fibre for employees stationed on Willis Island.

Occasionally old asbestos cement sheet washes up on Willis Island and is collected and bagged before being transported back to the mainland where it is disposed of in line with the Queensland Government's EPA legislative requirements. Full safety equipment is used.

Staff generate their own supply of hydrogen for use in weather balloons. Prior to 1994, a chemical process to meet hydrogen needs was used. This process produced a toxic residue that was a danger to the local birdlife. Because of this danger, a safer "electrolytic converter" is now used to break down water into hydrogen and oxygen.

Birdlife
The most common inhabitants are wedge-tailed shearwaters, sooty terns and common and black noddies. Their numbers are usually quite high and bird cries continue day and night on the island.  Several species of booby migrate through the Island including masked, brown and red-footed boobies, and also the lesser frigatebird. Crested terns are also seen to migrate, although not as often.  Other birds mentioned by John King Davis are the buff-banded rail as a resident, wood sandpiper, and sacred kingfisher and red-tailed tropicbird as occasional visitors.

Climate
Willis Island experiences a tropical savanna climate (Köppen: Aw, Trewartha: Awha), with a hot and oppressive wet season from November to April; and a warm, muggy dry season from May to October, typical for most of Far North Queensland. Warm, windy and humid weather predominates the island even during the winter, with the average temperature being 26.6 °C (79.9 °F), but the long dry season reduces average annual precipitation, which is 1073.4 mm (42.3 inches).

Temperatures are moderated in all seasons by the warm Coral Sea, which eliminates extreme weather. The absolute temperature range is very narrow: from 35.2 °C (95.4 °F) on the 9th of February 2002 to 18.4 °C (65.1 °F) on the 28th of June 2007. In addition, diurnal temperature range is limited in comparison to the city of Cairns on mainland Australia. High temperatures are similar year-round, but Cairns averages cooler nights in the wet and dry seasons, along with lowered humidity. Temperature is slightly cooler in the dry season during the day and night: averages range from 28.5 °C (83.3 °F) in February to 24.4 °C (75.9 °F) in July and August.

Precipitation is brought on by thunderstorms from northeasterly trade winds during the wet season, while the island is too far north for cold fronts from the Tasman Sea to arrive and deliver precipitation. Due to the "hit-or-miss" nature of these thunderstorms, precipitation is extremely variable in the summer. Only 1.0 mm (0.04 inches) was recorded in November 1992, but an astounding 1484.8 mm (58.46 inches) was recorded in March 1997, more than the annual average in just one month. Occasionally, cyclones can occur in the summer, and are more common than on the mainland, as average wind speeds are higher. Winters are much drier, bottoming at 7.1 mm (0.28 inches) in September.

See also
 List of islands of Australia
 List of lighthouses in the Coral Sea Islands

References

Further reading
 
 "Solitude and Solecisms: A Willis Island Notebook" by Frank Exon, edited by Neville Exon (Imprint: Australian Scholarly Publishing, 2012) is the journal and sketchbook of Frank Exon, a 27-year-old engineer for Amalgamated Wireless, kept while he was stationed on the island with two companions for six months in the 1920s: 'an engaging tale penned and illustrated by a natural writer and an astute observer of the natural world and of human nature, a testament to the resilience and good humour of a generation that had known the Great War'.

External links

 Coral Sea Islands
 Federation and Meteorology – Seventy-Five Years at Willis Island
 Willis Island Rain Radar
  Willis Island daily weather observations

Islands of the Coral Sea Islands Territory
1921 establishments in Australia
Meteorological observatories
Lighthouses in Coral Sea Islands
Bureau of Meteorology